Leelo Tungal (born 22 June 1947 in Tallinn) is an Estonian poet, children's writer, translator, editor and librettist.

Life and career
Tungal studied Estonian literature at the University of Tartu. After her graduation, she has worked as a teacher, editor, drama and literature consultant for the Estonian Puppet Theatre, and as a freelance writer. In 1994, she founded the children's magazine Hea Laps, and worked as its editor-in-chief until January 2019. She has published over 80 books of prose and poetry for children and young adults, has written several libretti for Estonian composers, and has translated children's poetry and plays from Bulgarian, English, Finnish, Russian, and several other languages.

Personal 
Leelo Tungal was married to composer Raimo Kangro; their children are writer Maarja Kangro, artist  and cultural critic Anna-Magdaleena Kangro.

Poetry (a selection)
 1966  (Peewits weirdly complained)
 1974  (Blooming chasm)
 1979 
 1979  (A book and a birch tree)
 1981  (Soil spinner)
 1982  (Grouse game)
 1986  (The substance of light)
 1993  (No name, no price)
 1994  (The only heroic deed is a smile)
 2002  (Hand is white, charcoal is black)
 2007  (Past perfect)

Children's poetry (a selection)
 1976  (A dog´s life)
 1978  (Reading Wolf)
 1982  (Little satchel)
 1983  
 1983  (Curious dog Tondu)
 1985  (Hello-Hello!)
 1988  (Old spunk kindergarten)
 1991  (Mother´s helpers)
 1992  (Round of the year)
 1993  (Piggy Pamp)
 1994 
 2000  (Berry root beneath the snow)
 2001  (Letters to Santa Claus)
 2004  (Ladybug with fax)
 2006  (Latvian ice cream)
 2009

Fiction (a selection)
 1978  (Pretty old Lady) [short stories]
 1980  (The Virgin Mary´s Four Days) [novel for young people]
 2008  (Comrade Kid and the Grown-Ups) [an autobiographical novel]
 2009  (Velvet and Sawdust) [novel, a sequel for Comrade Kid and the Grown-Ups]
 2018  (A Woman´s Touch, a.k.a. Comrade Kid and Dad) [novel, a sequel for Velvet and Sawdust]

Fiction for children (a selection)
 1983  (Half a dog)
 1986  (Potato, cow and a cosmonaut)
 1986  (Colorful Butterfly Summer)
 1989  (Pille, Madis and others)
 1989  (Kristiina, the Middle One)
 1991  (Barbara and the Summer Dogs)
 1993  (Vampire and pioneer)
 1994  (Barbara and the Autumn Dogs)
 1997  (We spook, we haunt)
 2010  (The Santa Claus Who Was Afraid of Kids)
 2013  (Carrot Works as a Carrot)
 2014  (Our Grandma is a Witch)
 2014  (Pedro the Poodle and the Apology Gift)
 2015  (Joseph the Bunny Looks for a Friend)
 2016  (Ludwig the Snowman´s Lucky Day)
 2017  (Hallo!) 
 2017  (Delilah the Dolphin´s Whale of a Friend)
 2018  (Tail)
 2018  (The Elves on fuss)

Translations 
Selected translations

Barbara and the Summer Dogs

 Russian:  2012

Barbara and the Autumn Dogs

 Russian:  2012

Bundle the Piglet

 Finnish:  1993

Comrade Kid and the Grown-Ups

 Latvian:  2018
 Lithuanian:  2013
 Russian:  2010

Felix the Hedgehog series

 Russian:  2014

A Half of a Dog

 Russian:  1991

Hello-Hello

 Russian:  1991

Juku, Kalle and Klabautermann in Tallinn

 Finnish:  2002

Kristiina, the Middle One

 Russian:  2009
 Finnish:  1994

Ludwig the Snowman´s Lucky Day

 Latvian:  2018
 German:  2017

The More the Merrier

 Russian:  1984

Potatoes, Cows and Cosmonauts

 English: Perioodika 1991

Tales of Miriam

 Russian:  2009

The Tilk Family Goes to the Song Festival

 Russian:  2011

Velvet and Sawdust

 Russian:  2012

The Virgin Mary´s Four Days

 Russian:  1986

Awards
 1995 Karl Eduard Sööt Award for children's literature (Happy Birthday!)
 1997 Annual Children’s Literature Award of the Cultural Endowment of Estonia (We Spook! We Haunt!)
 1999 Julius Oro Award for children's literature
 2000 Karl Eduard Sööt Award for children's literature (It Sure is Good!)
 2007 Karl Eduard Sööt Award for children's literature (Latvian Ice Cream)
 2007 Muhv Award for promoting children's literature 
 2008 Harjumaa Kultuuripärl (The Culture Pearl of Harjumaa)
 2010 IBBY Honour List (Comrade Kid and the Grown-Ups)
2010–2014, 2017, 2019 Astrid Lindgren Memorial Award candidate
2013 Good Children’s Book (Carrot Works as a Carrot)
2014 The Merit Award “With Children and For Children” of the Ombudsman for Children, for the lifetime achievement
2015 Ferdinand Johann Wiedemann Language Prize
2016 Good Children’s book (Ludwig the Snowman’s Lucky Day)
2017 Annual Children’s Literature Award of the Cultural Endowment of Estonia (Hallo!)
2018 National Lifetime Achievement Award for Culture
2018 Hans Christian Andersen Award nominee
2019 Viru County Literary Award (trilogy “Comrade Kid”)
2019 Baltic Assembly Prize in Literature

References

External links

Biography Eesti Lastekirjanduse Keskus 
Estonian Literature Centre 

Estonian women poets
Estonian children's writers
Estonian women children's writers
Librettists
1947 births
Living people
Writers from Tallinn
20th-century Estonian poets
21st-century Estonian poets
21st-century Estonian women writers
20th-century Estonian women writers
Recipients of the Order of the White Star, 4th Class